Bozkır is a town and district of Konya Province in the Mediterranean region of Turkey. According to 2008 census, population of the district is 31,601 of which 7,212 live in the town of Bozkır.

The town occupied a central position in ancient Isauria. The name Bozkır means steppe in Turkish and after the Turkish settlement in early Anatolian Seljuk Sultanate period, Bozkır was initially the name given to the region extending between the present-day Bozkır town marked by Çarşamba Stream and the lands around neighboring Seydişehir. The name Bozkır was eventually adopted for the town.

Notes

References
 

Populated places in Konya Province
Districts of Konya Province